Melville Y. Stewart (June 19, 1935 – June 19, 2020) was an American Philosopher and Professor of Philosophy Emeritus at Bethel University, Minnesota.

Bibliography
The Greater-Good Defence, An Essay on the Rationality of Faith, author, London:Macmillan//New York: St. Martin's, 1993. .
Проблемы Христианской Философии (Problems in Christian Philosophy), co-editor with Dan Clendenin, Moscow: Progress Academy Press, 1994. .
Philosophy of Religion, An Anthology of Contemporary Views, editor, in the Jones and Bartlett Series in Philosophy, second printing, Wadsworth Press, 1996. . 
《当代西方宗教哲学》, (Philosophy of Religion, An Anthology of Contemporary Views), Melville Y. Stewart, editor, Beijing: Peking University Press, 2005, .
 《东西方宗教伦理及其他》(East & West Religious Ethics and Other Essays), co-editor with Zhang Zhigang, Beijing: Central Compilation and Translation Press, 1997. 
The Symposium of Chinese-American Philosophy and Religious Studies: Volume 1, East & West Philosophy of Religion, co-editor with Zhang Zhigang, Bethesda: International Scholars Publications, 1998. .
Искупление (The Atonement), co-editor with Natalia Pecherskaya, St. Petersburg: St. Petersburg School of Religion and Philosophy Publishers, 1999. .
《欧美哲学与宗教讲演录》(Lectures on European and American Philosophy and Religion), co-editor with Zhao Dunhua, Beijing: Peking University Press, 1998. .
The Trinity: East/West Dialogue, Dordrecht: Kluwer, 2003, editor. .
 Пресвятая Троица, Russian edition, Alexander Kierlezhev editor, 2001.
《科学与宗教的对话》(A Dialogue Between Science and Religion), co-editor with Zhou Jianzhang and Kelly James Clark, Xiamen: Xiamen University Press, 2002. 
《跨宗教对话:中国与西方》(Interfaith Dialogue: East and West), co-editor with Fu Youde and Kelly James Clark, Beijing: Social Science Publishers, 2004. /B.
Philosophy of Religion, Beijing: co-editor with Xing Taotao, Beijing: Peking University Press, 2005. 
Science and Religion in Dialogue, Hao Changchi, Melville Y. Stewart, editors, Asia Humanities Press
《科学与宗教的对话》(Science and Religion in Dialogue), Vol. 1, co-editor with Hao Changchi, Beijing: Peking University Press, 2007. .
《科学与宗教：二十一 世纪时对话》(Science and Religion: 21st Century Dialogue), Vol. 2, co-editor with Xu Yingjin, Shanghai: Fudan University Press, 2008. .
Science and Religion in Dialogue, editor, Volume One, Oxford: Wiley-Blackwell Publishing, 2010. .
Science and Religion in Dialogue, editor, Volume Two, Oxford: Wiley-Blackwell Publishing, 2010. .
Dictionary of Western Philosophy, English/Pinyin/Chinese, co-author with Xu Yingjin, Beijing: Peking University Press, 2009. .
《科学与宗教：当前对话》(Science and Religion: Current Dialogue), Vol. 3, co-editor with Fu Youde, Beijing: Peking University Press, 2011. .
《科学与宗教：二十一 世纪问题》(Science and Religion: 21st Century Issues), Vol. 4, co-editor with Xing Taotao and Xiangdong Xu, Beijing: Peking University Press, 2015. 
《科学与宗教：当前争论》(Science and Religion: Current Debate), Vol. 5, co-editor with Zhu Donghua, Beijing: Peking University Press, 2014. .
《Наука и Религия в Диалоге (Science and Religion in Dialogue)》, Vol. 1, Natalia Pecherskaya and Melville Y. Stewart, editors, St. Petersburg, St. Petersburg School of Religion and Philosophy Publisher, 2014, .
《Наука и Религия в Диалоге (Science and Religion in Dialogue)》, Vol. 2, St. Natalia Pecherskaya and Melville Y. Stewart, editors, St. Petersburg, St. Petersburg School of Religion and Philosophy Publisher, 2015. .
《Наука и Религия в Диалоге (Science and Religion in Dialogue)》Vol. 3, Natalia Pecherskaya and Melville Y. Stewart, editors, St. Petersburg, St. Petersburg School of Religion and Philosophy Publisher, 2016, .
《Наука и Религия в Диалоге (Science and Religion in Dialogue)》Vol. 4, Natalia Pecherskaya and Melville Y. Stewart, editors, St. Petersburg, St. Petersburg School of Religion and Philosophy Publisher, 2017, .

References

American philosophy academics
Philosophers of religion
1935 births
2020 deaths